The 2014–15 Orlando Magic season was the 26th season of the franchise in the National Basketball Association (NBA). The Magic looked to improve on their 23–59 record the previous season where they had finished 5th in the Southeastern division and 13th in the Eastern Conference. While they did improve their record by two games, they still finished 5th and 13th in the division and conference, respectively.

Preseason

Draft picks

Regular season

Standings

Game log

Regular season

|- bgcolor="ffcccc"
| 1
| October 28
| @ New Orleans
| 
| Tobias Harris (25)
| Nikola Vučević (23)
| Elfrid Payton (7)
| Smoothie King Center17,907
| 0–1
|- bgcolor="ffcccc"
| 2
| October 30
| Washington
| 
| Nikola Vučević (23)
| Nikola Vučević (12)
| Elfrid Payton (7)
| Amway Center18,846
| 0–2

|- bgcolor="ffcccc"
| 3
| November 1
| Toronto
| 
| Evan Fournier (18)
| Nikola Vučević (12)
| Elfrid Payton (9)
| Amway Center16,141
| 0–3
|- bgcolor="ffcccc"
| 4
| November 4
| @ Chicago
| 
| Tobias Harris (21)
| Nikola Vučević (13)
| Elfrid Payton (7)
| United Center21,809
| 0–4
|- bgcolor="ccffcc"
| 5
| November 5
| @ Philadelphia
| 
| Tobias Harris (18)
| Channing Frye (11)
| Elfrid Payton (5)
| Wells Fargo Center12,111
| 1–4
|- bgcolor="ccffcc"
| 6
| November 7
| Minnesota
| 
| Evan Fournier (20)
| Tobias Harris (16)
| Elfrid Payton (4)
| Amway Center16,379
| 2–4
|- bgcolor="ffcccc"
| 7
| November 9
| @ Brooklyn
| 
| Nikola Vučević (27)
| Nikola Vučević (12)
| Elfrid Payton (6)
| Barclays Center16,127
| 2–5
|- bgcolor="ffcccc"
| 8
| November 11
| @ Toronto
| 
| Evan Fournier (24)
| Tobias Harris (13)
| Ridnour, Vučević (6)
| Air Canada Centre19,800
| 2–6
|- bgcolor="ccffcc"
| 9
| November 12
| @ New York
| 
| Evan Fournier (28)
| Nikola Vučević (13)
| Elfrid Payton (8)
| Madison Square Garden19,812
| 3–6
|- bgcolor="ccffcc"
| 10
| November 14
| Milwaukee
| 
| Tobias Harris (26)
| Tobias Harris (10)
| Nikola Vučević (4)
| Amway Center15,957
| 4–6
|- bgcolor="ffcccc"
| 11
| November 15
| @ Washington
| 
| Tobias Harris (19)
| Nikola Vučević (11)
| Victor Oladipo (7)
| Verizon Center19,110
| 4–7
|- bgcolor="ccffcc"
| 12
| November 17
| @ Detroit
| 
| Nikola Vučević (25)
| Nikola Vučević (14)
| Evan Fournier (8)
| The Palace of Auburn Hills11,619
| 5–7
|- bgcolor="ffcccc"
| 13
| November 19
| L.A. Clippers
| 
| Tobias Harris (25)
| Nikola Vučević (14)
| Elfrid Payton (5)
| Amway Center16,034
| 5–8
|- bgcolor="ccffcc"
| 14
| November 21
| @ Charlotte
| 
| Evan Fournier (21)
| Tobias Harris (16)
| Elfrid Payton (5)
| Time Warner Cable Arena18,126
| 6–8
|- bgcolor="ffcccc"
| 15
| November 22
| Miami
| 
| Nikola Vučević (33)
| Nikola Vučević (17)
| Evan Fournier (6)
| Amway Center18,846
| 6–9
|- bgcolor="ffcccc"
| 16
| November 24
| @ Cleveland
| 
| Victor Oladipo (22)
| Nikola Vučević (13)
| Maurice Harkless (4)
| Quicken Loans Arena20,562
| 6–10
|- bgcolor="ffcccc"
| 17
| November 26
| Golden State
| 
| Tobias Harris (16)
| Nikola Vučević (13)
| Elfrid Payton (5)
| Amway Center17,202
| 6–11
|- bgcolor="ffcccc"
| 18
| November 28
| @ Indiana
| 
| Nikola Vučević (16)
| Nikola Vučević (7)
| Elfrid Payton (6)
| Bankers Life Fieldhouse18,165
| 6–12
|- bgcolor="ccffcc"
| 19
| November 30
| @ Phoenix
| 
| Tobias Harris (21)
| Elfrid Payton (9)
| Oladipo, Payton (4)
| US Airways Center15,558
| 7–12

|- bgcolor="ffcccc"
| 20
| December 2
| @ Golden State
| 
| Victor Oladipo (27)
| Kyle O'Quinn (11)
| Elfrid Payton (6)
| Oracle Arena19,596
| 7–13
|- bgcolor="ffcccc"
| 21
| December 3
| @ L.A. Clippers
| 
| Tobias Harris (16)
| Dedmon, Harris (8)
| Elfrid Payton (6)
| Staples Center19,060
| 7–14
|- bgcolor="ccffcc"
| 22
| December 5
| @ Utah
| 
| Tobias Harris (22)
| Dewayne Dedmon (9)
| Victor Oladipo (6)
| EnergySolutions Arena18,997
| 8–14
|- bgcolor="ccffcc"
| 23
| December 6
| @ Sacramento
| 
| Tobias Harris (27)
| Dewayne Dedmon (8)
| Victor Oladipo (7)
| Sleep Train Arena16,021
| 9–14
|- bgcolor="ffcccc"
| 24
| December 10
| Washington
| 
| Victor Oladipo (17)
| Dewayne Dedmon (7)
| O'Quinn, Payton (4)
| Amway Center16,081
| 9–15
|- bgcolor="ffcccc"
| 25
| December 12
| @ Atlanta
| 
| Victor Oladipo (21)
| Tobias Harris (11)
| Evan Fournier (4)
| Philips Arena13,247
| 9–16
|- bgcolor="ccffcc"
| 26
| December 13
| Atlanta
| 
| Tobias Harris (20)
| Nikola Vučević (11)
| Oladipo, Payton (7)
| Amway Center15,939
| 10–16
|- bgcolor="ffcccc"
| 27
| December 15
| @ Toronto
| 
| Tobias Harris (18)
| Nikola Vučević (9)
| Victor Oladipo (4)
| Air Canada Centre19,800
| 10–17
|- bgcolor="ffcccc"
| 28
| December 17
| @ Boston
| 
| Nikola Vučević (18)
| Nikola Vučević (13)
| Fournier, Payton (4)
| TD Garden16,764
| 10–18
|- bgcolor="ffcccc"
| 29
| December 19
| Utah
| 
| Tobias Harris (24)
| Nikola Vučević (9)
| Elfrid Payton (11)
| Amway Center16,032
| 10–19
|- bgcolor="ffcccc"
| 30
| December 21
| Philadelphia
| 
| Victor Oladipo (23)
| Nikola Vučević (17)
| Elfrid Payton (6)
| Amway Center15,682
| 10–20
|- bgcolor="ccffcc"
| 31
| December 23
| Boston
| 
| Tobias Harris (19)
| Kyle O'Quinn (13)
| Elfrid Payton (7)
| Amway Center17,489
| 11–20
|- bgcolor="ffcccc"
| 32
| December 26
| Cleveland
| 
| Tobias Harris (16)
| Nikola Vučević (8)
| Victor Oladipo (8)
| Amway Center18,846
| 11–21
|- bgcolor="ccffcc"
| 33
| December 27
| @ Charlotte
| 
| Nikola Vučević (22)
| Nikola Vučević (11)
| Elfrid Payton (8)
| Time Warner Cable Arena19,085
| 12–21
|- bgcolor="ccffcc"
| 34
| December 29
| @ Miami
| 
| Nikola Vučević (26)
| Nikola Vučević (9)
| Elfrid Payton (8)
| American Airlines Arena19,887
| 13–21
|- bgcolor="ffcccc"
| 35
| December 30
| Detroit
| 
| Victor Oladipo (16)
| Dewayne Dedmon (10)
| Elfrid Payton (6)
| Amway Center17,414
| 13–22

|- bgcolor="ffcccc"
| 36
| January 2
| Brooklyn
| 
| Victor Oladipo (17)
| Elfrid Payton (9)
| Elfrid Payton (10)
| Amway Center17,008
| 13–23
|- bgcolor="ffcccc"
| 37
| January 3
| Charlotte
| 
| Victor Oladipo (21)
| Tobias Harris (11)
| Elfrid Payton (7)
| Amway Center15,274
| 13–24
|- bgcolor="ffcccc"
| 38
| January 7
| @ Denver
| 
| Nikola Vučević (20)
| Nikola Vučević (11)
| Oladipo, Payton (6)
| Pepsi Center13,513
| 13–25
|- bgcolor="ffcccc"
| 39
| January 9
| @ L.A. Lakers
| 
| Victor Oladipo (17)
| Nikola Vučević (11)
| Frye, Harris, O'Quinn, Oladipo (3)
| Staples Center18,997
| 13–26
|- bgcolor="ffcccc"
| 40
| January 10
| @ Portland
| 
| Nikola Vučević (36)
| Nikola Vučević (16)
| Oladipo, Payton, Ridnour (4)
| Moda Center19,546
| 13–27
|- bgcolor="ccffcc"
| 41
| January 12
| @ Chicago
| 
| Oladipo, Vučević (33)
| Nikola Vučević (11)
| Elfrid Payton (7)
| United Center21,302
| 14–27
|- bgcolor="ccffcc"
| 42
| January 14
| Houston
| 
| Victor Oladipo (32)
| Nikola Vučević (12)
| Victor Oladipo (6)
| Amway Center16,828
| 15–27
|- bgcolor="ffcccc"
| 43
| January 16
| Memphis
| 
| Elfrid Payton (22)
| Nikola Vučević (9)
| Elfrid Payton (12)
| Amway Center18,141
| 15–28
|- bgcolor="ffcccc"
| 44
| January 18
| Oklahoma City
| 
| Victor Oladipo (23)
| Nikola Vučević (7)
| Elfrid Payton (8)
| Amway Center16,128
| 15–29
|- bgcolor="ffcccc"
| 45
| January 21
| @ Detroit
| 
| Nikola Vučević (26)
| Nikola Vučević (15)
| Elfrid Payton (8)
| The Palace of Auburn Hills12,148
| 15–30
|- bgcolor="ffcccc"
| 46
| January 23
| @ New York
| 
| Nikola Vučević (34)
| Nikola Vučević (18)
| Elfrid Payton (11)
| Madison Square Garden19,812
| 15–31
|- bgcolor="ffcccc"
| 47
| January 25
| Indiana
| 
| Nikola Vučević (27)
| Nikola Vučević (7)
| Elfrid Payton (8)
| Amway Center16,704
| 15–32
|- bgcolor="ffcccc"
| 48
| January 26
| @ Memphis
| 
| Oladipo, Vučević (18)
| Nikola Vučević (12)
| Elfrid Payton (6)
| FedExForum15,407
| 15–33
|- bgcolor="ffcccc"
| 49
| January 29
| Milwaukee
| 
| Victor Oladipo (21)
| Nikola Vučević (14)
| Elfrid Payton (6) 
| Amway Center16,071
| 15–34
|- bgcolor="ffcccc"
| 50
| January 31
| Dallas
| 
| Nikola Vučević (15)
| Nikola Vučević (13)
| Payton, Harris (6) 
| Amway Center17,626
| 15–35

|- bgcolor="ffcccc"
| 51
| February 2
| @ Oklahoma City
| 
| Victor Oladipo (22)
| Gordon, O'Quinn (8)
| Oladipo, Harris (4)
| Chesapeake Energy Arena18,203
| 15–36
|- bgcolor="ffcccc"
| 52
| February 4
| @ San Antonio
| 
| Nikola Vučević (25)
| Nikola Vučević (13)
| Elfrid Payton (9)
| AT&T Center18,581
| 15–37
|- bgcolor="ccffcc"
| 53
| February 6
| L.A. Lakers
| 
| Tobias Harris (34)
| Nikola Vučević (13)
| Elfrid Payton (6)
| Amway Center16,206
| 16–37
|- bgcolor="ffcccc"
| 54
| February 8
| Chicago
| 
| Victor Oladipo (18)
| Elfrid Payton (9)
| Victor Oladipo (6)
| Amway Center16,944
| 16–38
|- bgcolor="ffcccc"
| 55
| February 9
| @ Washington
| 
| Evan Fournier (18)
| Nikola Vučević (8)
| Elfrid Payton (6)
| Verizon Center16,031
| 16–39
|- bgcolor="ccffcc"
| 56
| February 11
| New York
| 
| Nikola Vučević (28)
| Nikola Vučević (18)
| Payton, Oladipo (4)
| Amway Center15,473
| 17–39
|- align="center"
|colspan="9" bgcolor="#bbcaff"|All-Star Break
|- bgcolor="ccffcc"
| 57
| February 20
| New Orleans
| 
| Victor Oladipo (22)
| Nikola Vučević (13)
| Payton, Oladipo (11) 
| Amway Center18,259
| 18–39
|- bgcolor="ccffcc"
| 58
| February 22
| Philadelphia
| 
| Nikola Vučević (31)
| Nikola Vučević (14)
| Elfrid Payton (7)
| Amway Center16,108
| 19–39
|- bgcolor="ffcccc"
| 59
| February 25
| Miami
| 
| Nikola Vučević (26)
| Victor Oladipo (13)
| Elfrid Payton (9) 
| Amway Center18,309
| 19–40
|- bgcolor="ffcccc"
| 60
| February 27
| @ Atlanta
| 
| Nikola Vučević (21)
| Nikola Vučević (15)
| Victor Oladipo (6)
| Philips Arena18,968
| 19–41

|- bgcolor="ffcccc"
| 61
| March 1
| Charlotte
| 
| Victor Oladipo (21)
| Vučević, Dedmon, Harris (9)
| Victor Oladipo (5)
| Amway Center15,422
| 19–42
|- bgcolor="ffcccc"
| 62
| March 4
| Phoenix
| 
| Victor Oladipo (38)
| Dewayne Dedmon (8)
| Elfrid Payton (10)
| Amway Center15,822
| 19–43
|- bgcolor="ccffcc"
| 63
| March 6
| Sacramento
| 
| Victor Oladipo (32)
| Channing Frye (10)
| Elfrid Payton (12)
| Amway Center15,112
| 20–43
|- bgcolor="ccffcc"
| 64
| March 8
| Boston
| 
| Victor Oladipo (22)
| Dewayne Dedmon (16)
| Elfrid Payton (7) 
| Amway Center17,041
| 21–43
|- bgcolor="ffcccc"
| 65
| March 10
| @ Indiana
| 
| Tobias Harris (22)
| Dewayne Dedmon (8)
| Elfrid Payton (6)
| Bankers Life Fieldhouse17,295
| 21–44
|- bgcolor="ffcccc"
| 66
| March 11
| @ Milwaukee
| 
| Nikola Vučević (19)
| Nikola Vučević (14)
| Victor Oladipo (6)
| BMO Harris Bradley Center12,593
| 21–45
|- bgcolor="ffcccc"
| 67
| March 13
| @ Boston
| 
| Elfrid Payton (20) 
| Nikola Vučević (11)
| Elfrid Payton (9) 
| TD Garden18,624
| 21–46
|- bgcolor="ffcccc"
| 68
| March 15
| Cleveland
| 
| Victor Oladipo (25)
| Nikola Vučević (15)
| Elfrid Payton (10)
| Amway Center17,786
| 21–47
|- bgcolor="ffcccc"
| 69
| March 17
| @ Houston
| 
| Victor Oladipo (29)
| Nikola Vučević (15)
| Elfrid Payton (7) 
| Toyota Center18,235
| 21–48
|- bgcolor="ffcccc"
| 70
| March 18
| @ Dallas
| 
| Victor Oladipo (19)
| Elfrid Payton (12)
| Elfrid Payton (10)
| American Airlines Center20,294
| 21–49
|- bgcolor="ccffcc"
| 71
| March 20
| Portland
| 
| Oladipo, Payton, Vučević (22)
| Elfrid Payton (10)
| Elfrid Payton (10)
| Amway Center16,203
| 22–49
|- bgcolor="ffcccc"
| 72
| March 22
| Denver
| 
| Victor Oladipo (21)
| Payton, Vučević (8)
| Elfrid Payton (8)
| Amway Center15,788
| 22–50
|- bgcolor="ffcccc"
| 73
| March 25
| Atlanta
| 
| Elfrid Payton (19)
| Nikola Vučević (12)
| Elfrid Payton (7) 
| Amway Center17,224
| 22–51
|- bgcolor="ffcccc"
| 74
| March 27
| Detroit
| 
| Tobias Harris (21)
| Nikola Vučević (14)
| Elfrid Payton (13)
| Amway Center16,427
| 22–52

|- bgcolor="ffcccc"
| 75
| April 1
| San Antonio
| 
| Victor Oladipo (24)
| Nikola Vučević (11)
| Oladipo, Payton (7)
| Amway Center17,229
| 22–53
|- bgcolor="ccffcc"
| 76
| April 3
| @ Minnesota
| 
| Nikola Vučević (37)
| Nikola Vučević (17)
| Elfrid Payton (13)
| Target Center18,334
| 23–53
|- bgcolor="ccffcc"
| 77
| April 4
| @ Milwaukee
| 
| Tobias Harris (23)
| Tobias Harris (10)
| Elfrid Payton (11)
| BMO Harris Bradley Center14,090
| 24–53
|- bgcolor="ccffcc"
| 78
| April 8
| Chicago
| 
| Victor Oladipo (23)
| Dewayne Dedmon (11)
| Elfrid Payton (9)
| Amway Center18,249
| 25–53
|- bgcolor="ffcccc"
| 79
| April 10
| Toronto
| 
| Victor Oladipo (19)
| Tobias Harris (7)
| Elfrid Payton (8) 
| Amway Center16,227
| 25–54
|- bgcolor="ffcccc"
| 80
| April 11
| New York
| 
| Victor Oladipo (21)
| Nikola Vučević (13)
| Elfrid Payton (9) 
| Amway Center17,207
| 25–55
|- bgcolor="ffcccc"
| 81
| April 13
| @ Miami
| 
| Victor Oladipo (30)
| Tobias Harris (12)
| Victor Oladipo (4)
| American Airlines Arena19,600
| 25–56
|- bgcolor="ffcccc"
| 82
| April 15
| @ Brooklyn
| 
| Nikola Vučević (26)
| Nikola Vučević (11)
| Elfrid Payton (6)
| Barclays Center17,098
| 25–57

Player statistics

Roster

Transactions

Trades

Free agents

Re-signed

Additions

Subtractions

Awards and honors
 Elfrid Payton – All-Rookie 1st Team

References

External links

 2014–15 Orlando Magic preseason at ESPN
 2014–15 Orlando Magic regular season at ESPN

Orlando Magic seasons
Orlando Magic
Orlando Magic
Orlando Magic